WMBD (1470 kHz) is the oldest radio station in Peoria, Illinois.  It broadcasts a news/talk format and is owned by Duke Wright with the license held by Midwest Communications, Inc.  The radio studios and offices are on Fulton Street in Peoria.

WMBD is powered at 5,000 watts, with a directional signal.  By day, a two-tower array is used, switching to a four-tower array at night to avoid causing interference with other stations.  The transmitter is on County Road 2100 East in Groveland Township, Illinois.  Programming is also heard on a 250 watt FM translator, W262BY at 100.3 MHz.  WMBD is also available in HD on sister station WPBG-HD4.  WMBD itself is not licensed to broadcast in HD.

Programming
WMBD has local shows in morning and afternoon drive time.  Weekdays begin with Greg & Dan, with Craig Collins hosting afternoons.  The rest of the weekday schedule is made up of nationally syndicated talk shows:  Glenn Beck, Dave Ramsey, "Markley, Van Camp & Collins" (based at WMBD), Dana Loesch, "Coast to Coast AM with George Noory" and "This Morning, America's First News with Gordon Deal."  

Weekends include shows on home improvement, rural life, religion, technology and the law.  Weekend hosts include Kim Komando, Joe Pags, Bill Handel, Bill Cunningham, "The Jesus Christ Show with Neil Saavedra" and "Somewhere in Time with Art Bell."  Most hours begin with a news update from Fox News Radio.  The station carries Bradley Braves basketball games from Bradley University in Peoria.

History

Early Years
WMBD first signed on in 1927.  It is the oldest radio station in the Peoria area.  The call letters are associated with a local legend that President Theodore Roosevelt once described Grandview Drive, the location of the station's original studios, as "the World's Most Beautiful Drive".

The station was a long-time CBS Radio network affiliate until 2001.  Through the 1930s, 40s and 50s, WMBD aired the CBS line up of dramas, comedies, news, sports, soap operas, game shows and big band broadcasts during the "Golden Age of Radio."

Full Service Radio
Though marketed as a news-talk station now, WMBD has for decades broadcast a full service format, offering news, talk, weather, agricultural reports, sports and music.  Past announcers included Bob Carlton, Farmer Bill, Milton Budd, and John Williams, who is now at WGN.  The station always had strong agribusiness coverage to serve rural portions of its coverage area, and for many years had a noon farm show, which has now moved to sister station WIRL.  Colleen Callahan was the long-time agriculture news director.  

WMBD is the flagship station for Compass Media Networks' Markley, Van Camp and Robbins, which rolled out in syndication in 2019. Prior to the death of Rush Limbaugh, the trio had recorded their show while Limbaugh was broadcast live on WMBD.  Markley, Van Camp and Robbins originally aired on WMBD on a three-hour delay.

WMBD has broadcast Bradley Braves basketball games for over 60 years.  Current Bradley announcer is Dave Snell who has been doing Bradley play-by-play for over 25 years.  WMBD carried St. Louis Cardinals baseball games for many years until 2014, when those games moved to sister station WIRL.

Ownership
WMBD is no longer co-owned with WMBD-TV channel 31; Midwest Television, which owned WMBD, WPBG, and WMBD-TV for decades, divested itself of all its stations outside of San Diego in the 1990s, selling WMBD-TV to Nexstar Broadcasting and the radio stations to JMP Radio Group, a local division of Triad Broadcasting.  Triad has since bought WIRL, WSWT, WXCL, and WDQX (now WKZF). Effective May 1, 2013, Triad sold WMBD and 29 other stations to L&L Broadcasting for $21 million. L&L was later merged into parent company Alpha Media in February 2014.

On February 4, 2019, Alpha Media announced that it would sell its Peoria cluster to Midwest Communications for $21.6 million. The sale closed on April 30, 2019.

See also
 Grandview Drive
 WMBD-TV

References

External links

Query the FCC's FM station database for W262BY
Radio-Locator Information on W262BY
  — message thread about W262BY; includes comments from engineer
FCC History Cards for WMBD

Radio stations established in 1927
News and talk radio stations in the United States
MBD
Midwest Communications radio stations